Loxonia is a genus of flowering plants belonging to the family Gesneriaceae.

Its native range is Peninsula Malaysia to Sumatera.

Species:

Loxonia burttiana 
Loxonia discolor 
Loxonia hirsuta

References

Didymocarpoideae
Gesneriaceae genera